This is a list of Swedish football transfers for the 2021 summer transfer window. Only transfers featuring Allsvenskan are listed.

Allsvenskan

Note: Flags indicate national team as has been defined under FIFA eligibility rules. Players may hold more than one non-FIFA nationality.

AIK

In:

Out:

Degerfors IF

In:

Out:

Djurgårdens IF

In:

Out:

IF Elfsborg

In:

Out:

BK Häcken

In:

Out:

Halmstads BK

In:

Out:

Hammarby IF

In:

Out:

IFK Göteborg

In:

Out:

Kalmar FF

In:

Out:

Malmö FF

In:

Out:

Mjällby AIF

In:

Out:

IFK Norrköping

In:

Out:

IK Sirius

In:

Out:

Varbergs BoIS

In:

Out:

Örebro SK

In:

Out:

Östersunds FK

In:

Out:

See also
 2021 Allsvenskan

References

External links
 Official site of the SvFF
 Official site of the Allsvenskan

Football transfers summer 2021
Transfers
2021